St. Peter's Church in the Great Valley is a historic Episcopal church.  It began in 1704 as a missionary parish of the Church of England in the colonial Province of Pennsylvania. The church is located in suburban Philadelphia, in East Whiteland Township, Chester County, with a Malvern postal address. A more detailed history of the church is on their website.  The parish is part of the Episcopal Diocese of Pennsylvania.

The current stone church building was constructed sporadically between 1728–1744 to replace an earlier wooden building built by 1710.  The 1744 building was a stone structure with a medium pitched gable roof measuring 47 feet by 28 feet.  A two-story addition was built in 1856, and the -story Parish House added in 1901. During the American Revolution, the church was used as a hospital by both British and American forces.

By local tradition, after the nearby Battle of Paoli in 1777 the British Army, recognizing St. Peter's as part of the Church of England, oversaw the burial of a British officer (believed to be Captain William Wolfe, commander of the Light Company of the British 40th Regiment of Foot), at least two other unidentified British soldiers, and at least five unidentified American soldiers killed in the battle. The British and American troops are buried side by side along the old west wall of the churchyard.  Several small American and British flags are traditionally kept at the graves out of respect for the soldiers from both armies (see illustration, below).

Over its 300+ year history, St. Peter's has been led by more than three dozen missionaries and priests. After a series of architectural modernizations (many later referred to as vandalisms) in the nineteenth and early twentieth century, the church was carefully restored in 1944 to somewhat approximate the simplicity of the original 1744 building.

Early in the 21st century the growing congregation built a timber-framed parish center and modern worship space designed in a style reminiscent of the original Welsh barns in the area.  The original church building, and the adjacent burial ground, was placed on the National Register of Historic Places in 1977.

References

External links
Official Website
 Church of St. Peter-in-the-Great Valley, Saint Peter's Road (East Whiteland Township), Devault, Chester County, PA: 4 photos, 6 data pages, and 1 photo caption page at Historic American Buildings Survey

Historic American Buildings Survey in Pennsylvania
Cemeteries in Chester County, Pennsylvania
Churches on the National Register of Historic Places in Pennsylvania
Churches completed in 1744
18th-century Episcopal church buildings
Churches in Chester County, Pennsylvania
Episcopal churches in Pennsylvania
National Register of Historic Places in Chester County, Pennsylvania
1744 establishments in Pennsylvania